St Peter's Church, is an early Victorian Church of England church in Arkley, in the London Borough of Barnet. It is a grade II listed building.

History
The construction of the church, from local bricks, was funded by Enosh Durant (c1778-1848). It was consecrated on 1 November 1840 by Charles James Blomfield, Bishop of London. Durant, who is commemorated by a monument placed in the church by his widow the year after his death, was the owner of a local brickworks, and lived at the High Canons estate in Shenley, near Borehamwood.

The chancel was added in 1898 and was consecrated by the Bishop of St Albans, John Festing. The stained glass of the east window was installed in 1903. In 1921 a Lady Chapel was added and a war memorial was unveiled opposite the church in 1920. There are also memorials in the church to the fallen of both World Wars.

St Peter's was originally built for the benefit of Durant's tenants and workers, but, after his death it became a chapel-of-ease of St John the Baptist Church, Chipping Barnet. Arkley became a separate parish in 1905 with St Peter's as its church. Since the 1980s St Peter's has been part of the Chipping Barnet Team Ministry.

Notable interments
The ashes of the English actor Trevor Howard are buried in an unmarked plot near the church. A small plaque on the exterior wall of the church commemorates the Howard family.

Gallery

References

External links 
 
 

19th-century Church of England church buildings
Arkley
Grade II listed buildings in the London Borough of Barnet
Grade II listed churches in London
Church of England church buildings in the London Borough of Barnet
Churches completed in 1840
Gothic Revival church buildings in London
Diocese of St Albans